Alisher Mirzoev (born 1 January 1999) is a Tajik professional footballer who plays as a midfielder for Russian Second League club SKA Rostov-on-Don. He also holds Russian citizenship (as ).

Career
Prior to the 2021 Kyrgyz Premier League season, Mirzoev was registered by Alay Osh.

Career statistics

Club

Notes

References

1999 births
Living people
Tajikistani footballers
Association football midfielders
Speranța Nisporeni players
FC Alay players
FC SKA Rostov-on-Don players
Moldovan Super Liga players
Kyrgyz Premier League players
Tajikistani expatriate footballers
Expatriate footballers in Moldova
Tajikistani expatriate sportspeople in Moldova
Expatriate footballers in Russia
Tajikistani expatriate sportspeople in Russia
Expatriate footballers in Kyrgyzstan
Tajikistani expatriate sportspeople in Kyrgyzstan